The LE-7 and its succeeding upgrade model the LE-7A are staged combustion cycle LH/LOX liquid rocket engines produced in Japan for the H-II series of launch vehicles. Design and production work was all done domestically in Japan, the first major (main/first-stage) liquid rocket engine with that claim, in a collaborative effort from the National Space Development Agency (NASDA), Aerospace Engineering Laboratory (NAL), Mitsubishi Heavy Industries, and Ishikawajima-Harima. NASDA and NAL have since been integrated into JAXA. However, a large part of the work was contracted to Mitsubishi, with Ishikawajima-Harima providing turbomachinery, and the engine is often referred to as the Mitsubishi LE-7(A).

The original LE-7 was an expendable, high efficiency, medium-sized motor with sufficient thrust for use on the H-II.

H-II Flight 8, only operational LE-7 failure

The fuel turbopump had an issue using the originally designed inducer (a propeller-like axial pump used to raise the inlet pressure of the propellant ahead of the main turbopumps to prevent cavitation) where the inducer would itself begin to cavitate and cause an imbalance resulting in excessive vibration. A comprehensive post-flight analysis of the unsuccessful 8th H-II launch, including a deep ocean retrieval of the wreckage, determined that fatigue due to this vibration was the cause of premature engine failure.

LE-7A
The LE-7A is an upgraded model from the LE-7 rocket engine. Basic design is unchanged from the original model. The 7A had additional engineering effort placed on cost cutting, reliability, and performance developments. The renovation was undertaken to mate it with the likewise improved H-IIA launch vehicle, with the common goal being a more reliable, more powerful and flexible, and more cost effective launch system.

Changes / improvements
Specific emphasis was placed on reducing or the amount of required welding by allowing for more machined or cast components, and to simplify as many of the remaining welds as possible. This resulted in a substantial rework of the pipe routing (which makes the outward appearance of the two models considerably different). To combat the fuel inducer complications described above, the fuel inducer was redesigned for the 7A. The oxidizer inducer was also redesigned, but this was primarily due to poor performance at low inlet pressures as opposed to reliability concerns. The fuel turbopump itself was also the subject of various durability enhancements. Additionally the combustion chamber/injector assembly underwent a number of small changes, like decreasing the number of injector elements, to reduce machining complexity (and thus cost) and improve reliability.

New nozzle design (side-loading problem)
For the new engine model, a nozzle extension was designed that could be added to the base of the new standard “short” nozzle when extra performance was required. But when the engine was fitted with the nozzle extension, the 7A encountered a new problem with unprecedented side-loads and irregular heating on the nozzle strong enough to damage the gimbal actuators and  regenerative cooling tubes during startup. Meticulous computational fluid dynamics (CFD) work was able to sufficiently replicate and trace the dangerous transient loading and a new one-piece “long” nozzle with full regenerative cooling (as opposed to the original short nozzle with a separate film-cooled extension) was designed to mitigate the problem. Before this new nozzle was ready, some H-IIA's were launched using only the short nozzle. The 7A no longer uses a separate nozzle extension in any configuration.

Use on H-IIB
The new H-IIB launch vehicles uses two LE-7A engines in its first stage.

LE-7A specifications
 Operational cycle: staged combustion
 Fuel: hydrogen 
 Oxidizer: liquid oxygen 
 Mixture ratio (oxidizer to fuel): 5.90
 Short nozzle:
 Rated thrust (sea level): 
 Rated thrust (vacuum): 
 Specific impulse (sea level):
 Specific impulse (vacuum): 
 Long nozzle:
 Rated thrust (sea level): 
 Rated thrust (vacuum): 
 Specific impulse (sea level): 
 Specific impulse (vacuum): 
 Dry mass: 
 Length:
 short nozzle: 3.2 m
 long nozzle: 3.7 m
 Throttle capability: 72–100%
 Thrust-to-weight: 65.9
 Nozzle area ratio: 51.9:1
 Combustion chamber pressure: 
 Liquid hydrogen turbopump: 41,900 rpm 
 Liquid oxygen turbopump: 18,300 rpm

See also
 LE-5
 LE-9
 H-II, H-IIA, & H-IIB
 Comparison of orbital rocket engines
 Liquid-fuel rocket
 Staged combustion cycle
 JAXA

References

External links

 Encyclopedia Astronautica info page on the LE-7
 Encyclopedia Astronautica info page on the LE-7A
 Japanese Wikipedia LE-7 page (in Japanese)
 Japanese Wikipedia LE-7A page (in Japanese)
 H-IIA Rocket Engine Development
 Overview of the H-IIA Launch Vehicle Includes H-IIA-F6 failure analysis

Rocket engines of Japan
Rocket engines using hydrogen propellant
Rocket engines using the staged combustion cycle